Lophophelma erionoma is a moth of the family Geometridae first described by Charles Swinhoe in 1893. It is found in the Chinese provinces of Hunan, Guangxi, Zhejiang, Fujian, Jiangxi, Hainan and Sichuan, and in the north-eastern Himalayas and Sundaland. The habitat consists of lower montane and upper montane forests.

Adults are reddish brown with a whitish area just distal to the posterior curvature of the forewing postmedial.

Subspecies
Lophophelma erionoma erionoma (north-western Himalaya)
Lophophelma erionoma albicomitata (L. B. Prout, 1927) (Sundaland)
Lophophelma erionoma kiangsiensis (Chu, 1981) (China: Zhejiang, Jiangxi)
Lophophelma erionoma subnubigosa (L. B. Prout, 1927) (western China)

References

Moths described in 1893
Pseudoterpnini